

Track listing
CD
 逃 Escape (Broadway CM Themesong) 
 很忘 Very Forgetful
 零時零分 Zero Hour Zero Minute
 密友 Close Friend ("On the First Beat"-TVB Ending Song) 
 暖光 Warm Light
 螢 Glow
 床前無月光 No Moonlight Shining on My Bed
 解語花 Riddle Flower (Korean Drama "황진이" Hwang Jini Themesong) 
 陪我長大  Growing Up With Me (MTR CM Themesong) 
 渴望晨曦的女孩 The Girl Who Wishes To See The Morning Light

Bonus DVD
 逃 Escape(Broadway CM Themesong)
 零時零分 Dawn (live)

Joey Yung albums
2007 albums
Cantonese-language albums